Louis Gabriel d’Antessanty (or  Abbé G.)  (October 26, 1834, in Troyes – January 6, 1922, in Troyes) was a French entomologist.

His principal publications are:

L'étude des Hémiptères. Feuille des Jeunes naturalistes XIII (1881). (English: Hemiptera studies)
Catalogue des Hémiptères-Hétéroptères de l'Aube Dufour-Bouquot Plaquette. Grand In-8 Broché. (English: Aube's hemiptera-heteroptera census by Dufour-Bouquot and Plaquette) Troyes (1891).
Liste des Orthoptères observés dans l'Aube. Mémoires de la Société Académique de l’Aube, Tome xxv : 1-9 (1916). (English: List of Aube's orthoptera species)

And on general natural history:

L'étude de l'histoire naturelle. Lecture faite en séance publique de la Société Académique de l'Aube. (English: Open lecture by the Aube academic society)

The types of the new species of Hemiptera described by d’Antessanty are listed in Royer, M. 1922. Les types de la collection d'Hémipt Pres de l'abbé G. d'Antessanty. Bulletin de la Société Entomologique de France 1922:268-269.

1834 births
1922 deaths
French entomologists